Little Heath may refer to one of several locations in the United Kingdom:

Cheshire
Little Heath, Cheshire East , in Audlem parish
Little Heath, Cheshire West and Chester, in Christleton parish

Hertfordshire
Little Heath, near Hemel Hempstead, Hertfordshire, between Hemel Hempstead and Berkhamsted
Little Heath, near Potters Bar, Hertfordshire, immediately to the north of Potters Bar

Elsewhere
Little Heath, Berkshire, a suburb of Reading
Little Heath, Coventry, an area of the city
Little Heath, London, an area of Ilford
Little Heath, Staffordshire, a hamlet in Dunston parish
Little Heath, Surrey, an area of Stoke D'Abernon